José Antonio Solano Moreno (born 4 February 1985 in Cartagena, Region of Murcia) is a Spanish professional footballer who plays as a central defender.

External links

1985 births
Living people
Sportspeople from Cartagena, Spain
Spanish footballers
Footballers from the Region of Murcia
Association football defenders
Segunda División B players
Tercera División players
Cádiz CF B players
CD Leganés players
Écija Balompié players
FC Barcelona Atlètic players
CD Badajoz players
San Fernando CD players
Austrian Football Bundesliga players
2. Liga (Austria) players
Wolfsberger AC players
SV Horn players
Spain youth international footballers
Spanish expatriate footballers
Expatriate footballers in Austria
Spanish expatriate sportspeople in Austria